Uibaí is a municipality in the state of Bahia in the North-East region of Brazil. It is located about  byroad northwest of Salvador. Xique-Xique and the São Francisco River is to the northwest.

A rural area, population growth has been slow; in 1950 it had a population of 11,890, and as of 2020 it had a population of 13,891 people.

Settlements
The municipality consists of the main town of Uibaí, the District of Hidrolândia, and the settlements Quixabeira, Boca d'Aguá, Olho d’Água, Lagoinha, Laranjeiras, Zumba, Brasil, Poço, Altamira, Sobreira, Grama, Paraibinha, Caldeirão, Faz. Boa Sorte, Mandacaru, and Circuito dos Baixões.

See also
List of municipalities in Bahia

References

Municipalities in Bahia